is a railway station in the city of Nakano, Nagano, Japan, operated by the private railway operating company Nagano Electric Railway.

Lines
Shinano-Takehara Station is a station on the Nagano Electric Railway Nagano Line and is 29.3 kilometers from the terminus of the line at Nagano Station.

Station layout
The station consists of two ground-level opposed side platforms serving two tracks. The platforms are not numbered The station is unattended.

Platforms

Adjacent stations

History
It was renamed to its present name on 16 June 1932.

Passenger statistics
In fiscal 2015, the station was used by an average of 33 passengers daily (boarding passengers only).

Surrounding area

See also
 List of railway stations in Japan

References

External links

 

Railway stations in Japan opened in 1927
Railway stations in Nagano Prefecture
Nagano Electric Railway
Nakano, Nagano